Jessica Ann Dereschuk (born May 3, 1983) is an American television personality and beauty queen from Stacy, Minnesota, who has competed in the Miss USA pageant.

Dereschuk was born to Gregory and Valarie Vaught Dereschuk. She has one brother named Nicholas. One sister named Alexandra.

Dereschuk won the Miss Minnesota USA title in her first attempt in late 2003. She represented Minnesota in the Miss USA 2004 pageant broadcast live from the Kodak Theatre in Hollywood, California, in April 2004. Dereschuk did not place in the nationally televised pageant, which was won by Shandi Finnessey of Missouri.

As Miss Minnesota USA, Dereschuk worked to increase youth voter participation, supporting the Minnesota Secretary of State's "Get Out the Vote" initiatives. For her contributions to Minnesota's highest-in-the-nation voter turnout in 2004, 20 December 2004 was declared "Jessica Dereschuk Day" in Minnesota. One month previously, 20 November 2004 had been declared "Jessica Dereschuk Day" in Chisago County. 
 
Dereschuk graduated from North Branch High School in 2001 and later completed a degree in Fashion Merchandising and Women's Studies from Century Community College.  After completing her year-long reign as Miss Minnesota USA, she appeared on the reality TV show The Cut in 2005 and worked as a wardrobe and photo stylist for Posh Makeup Artists.

References

External links
 Miss Minnesota USA official website
Miss USA official website

Living people
Miss USA 2004 delegates
People from Chisago County, Minnesota
1983 births
American people of Ukrainian descent